not to be confused with the village of Hørning in Randers municipality

Hørning is a town in central Denmark with a population of 8,395 (1 January 2022), located in Skanderborg Municipality on the peninsula of Jutland. Today Hørning is a southwestern suburb of Aarhus located between Aarhus and Skanderborg

Hørning should not be mistaken for Herning which is the bigger, more metropolitan city in Jutland where the regional train passing through Hørning is also destined to.

Etymology
Hørning got its name from a bend in the main road that runs through the town. In Danish, a bend can be loosely translated to "Hjørne" (Corner), and "ing" (People) is a typical ending for city names in Denmark, dating the name to the Middle Ages. Over the years the "j" disappeared, and thus the name became Hørning. The bend in the main road is close by "Hørning Kro", the town inn. On the other side of the bend, you'll find the old rider school, which was a commoners' school built by King Frederick IV.

Notable people 
 Johannes Hjelmslev (1873 in Hørning – 1950) a mathematician who worked in geometry and the history of geometry
 Jesper Rask (born 1988 in Hørning) a Danish football goalkeeper, 294 caps with Hobro IK
 Stig Tøfting (born 1969) a Danish football player, turning out for Bolton Wanderers F.C. and Hamburger SV
 Nicklas Nielsen (born 1997 in  Hørning) a Danish Ferrari GT factory racing driver

External links
Official municipality website

References

Cities and towns in the Central Denmark Region
Skanderborg Municipality